Jerry Knirk is a New Hampshire doctor and politician who served in the New Hampshire House of Representatives.

References

Living people
Democratic Party members of the New Hampshire House of Representatives
21st-century American politicians
Year of birth missing (living people)